Shallcross is a surname. Notable people with the surname include:

Alan Shallcross (1932–2010), British television producer
Arthur Shallcross (1876–1950), British association football manager
David Shallcross, Australian academic
Mary Ann Shallcross Smith (born 1952), American educator and politician
Robert Shallcross, American film director, screenwriter and advertising writer